Alexander Schowtka (born 18 September 1963 in Valencia, Venezuela) is a German former swimmer who competed in the 1984 Summer Olympics.

References

1963 births
Living people
Sportspeople from Valencia, Venezuela
German male swimmers
German male freestyle swimmers
Olympic swimmers of West Germany
Swimmers at the 1984 Summer Olympics
Olympic silver medalists for West Germany
World Aquatics Championships medalists in swimming
European Aquatics Championships medalists in swimming
Medalists at the 1984 Summer Olympics
Olympic silver medalists in swimming